Rajakumari may refer to:
Rajakumari, Idukki district, a village in Kerala, India
 Rajakumari (1947 film), a 1947 film
 Rajakumari (2009 film), a 2009 film
 Rajakumari (TV series), a 2013 TV series
 Raja Kumari (born 1986), Indian-American singer